The Vicar of Wakefield is a 1917 American silent historical drama film directed by Ernest C. Warde and starring Frederick Warde, Boyd Marshall and Kathryn Adams. It is based on the 1766 novel The Vicar of Wakefield by Oliver Goldsmith. Unlike many productions of the era, the film still survives.

Cast
 Frederick Warde as Vicar of Wakefield 
 Boyd Marshall as George Primrose 
 Kathryn Adams as Olivia Primrose 
 Gladys Leslie as Sophia Primrose 
 Thomas A. Curran as Knight Geoffrey / Mr. Burchell 
 Robert Vaughn as Squire Thornhill / Squire Wilmot 
 Carey L. Hastings as Mrs. Primrose 
 William Parke Jr. as Moses Primrose 
 Tula Belle as Dick Primrose 
 Barbara Howard as Bill Primrose 
 Grace DeCarlton as Arabella Wilmot 
 Arthur Bauer as Mr. Wilmot 
 Morgan Jones as Jenkinson

References

Bibliography
 Richard Lewis Ward. When the Cock Crows: A History of the Pathé Exchange. SIU Press, 2016.

External links

1917 films
Films directed by Ernest C. Warde
American silent feature films
1910s English-language films
Pathé Exchange films
American black-and-white films
Films set in England
Films set in the 18th century
1910s historical drama films
American historical drama films
1917 drama films
1910s American films
Silent American drama films